Luis Miguel Evangelista Tolentino (born April 20, 1996 in Caloocan, Metro Manila), popularly known as Miggy Tolentino as a screen name is a Filipino actor, model and television personality. He is the one of the member of the home group That's My Bae and he is popularly seen in the noontime variety show Eat Bulaga!.

Personal life

Career

Filmography

References

1996 births
Living people
Filipino male television actors
Filipino male film actors
Filipino Internet celebrities
Male actors from Metro Manila
People from Caloocan
Tagalog people

GMA Network personalities